(15 May 1857 – 21 May 1911) was a Scottish-American astronomer. She was a single mother, hired by the director of the Harvard College Observatory to help in the photographic classification of stellar spectra. She helped develop a common designation system for stars and cataloged more than ten thousand stars, 59 gaseous nebulae, over 310 variable stars, and 10 novae and other astronomical phenomena. Among several career achievements that advanced astronomy, Fleming is noted for her discovery of the Horsehead Nebula in 1888.

Early life
Williamina Paton Stevens was born in Dundee, Scotland on 15 May 1857, to Mary Walker and Robert Stevens, a carver and gilder. She worked, starting at the age of fourteen, as a pupil-
teacher. In 1877, she married James Orr Fleming, an accountant and widower, also of Dundee. The couple had one son, Edward P. Fleming.

Career
In 1878 she and her husband emigrated to Boston, Massachusetts, US, when she was 21. After her husband abandoned her and her young son, she worked as a maid in the home of Professor Edward Charles Pickering, the director of the Harvard College Observatory (HCO). Pickering's wife Elizabeth recommended Williamina as having talents beyond custodial and maternal arts, and in 1879 Pickering hired Fleming to conduct part-time administrative work at the observatory.

In 1881, Pickering invited Fleming to formally join the HCO and taught her how to analyze stellar spectra. She became one of the founding members of the Harvard Computers, an all-women cadre of human computers hired by Pickering to compute mathematical classifications and edit the observatory's publications.

Henry Draper Catalogue, 1886
In 1886, Mary Anna Draper, the wealthy widow of astronomer Henry Draper, started the Henry Draper Memorial to fund the HCO's research. In response, the HCO began work on the first Henry Draper Catalogue, a long-term project to obtain the optical spectra of as many stars as possible and to index and classify stars by spectra.

Fleming was placed in charge of the Draper Catalogue project. A disagreement soon developed as to how to best classify the stars. The analysis had been started by Nettie Farrar, but she left a few months later to be married. Antonia Maury advocated for a complex classification scheme. Fleming, however, wanted a much more simple, straightforward approach.

The latest Harvard College Observatory images contained photographed spectra of stars that extended into the ultraviolet range, which allowed much more accurate classifications than recording spectra by hand through an instrument at night. Fleming devised a system for classifying stars according to the relative amount of hydrogen observed in their spectra, known as the Pickering-Fleming system. Stars showing hydrogen as the most abundant element were classified A; those of hydrogen as the second-most abundant element, B; and so on. 

Later, her colleague Annie Jump Cannon reordered the classification system based upon the surface temperature of stars, resulting in the Harvard spectral classification which is still in use today. 

In 1890, the HCO published the first Henry Draper Catalogue as a result of years of work by their female computer team, a catalog with more than 10,000 stars classified according to their spectrum. The majority of these classifications were done by Fleming. Fleming also made it possible to go back and compare recorded plates, by organizing thousands of photographs by telescope along with other identifying factors. In 1898, she was appointed Curator of Astronomical Photographs at Harvard, the first woman to hold the position.

At the 1893 World's Fair in Chicago, Fleming openly advocated for other women in the sciences in her talk "A Field for Woman's Work in Astronomy", where she openly promoted the hiring of female assistants in astronomy. Her speech suggested she agreed with the prevailing idea that women were inferior, but felt that, if given greater opportunities, they would be able to become equals; in other words, the sex differences in this regard were more culturally constructed than biologically grounded.

Notable discoveries
During her career, Fleming discovered a total of 59 gaseous nebulae, over 310 variable stars, and 10 novae. 

Most notably, in 1888, Fleming discovered the Horsehead Nebula on a telescope-photogrammetry plate made by astronomer W. H. Pickering, brother of E.C. Pickering. She described the bright nebula (later known as IC 434) as having "a semicircular indentation 5 minutes in diameter 30 minutes south of Zeta Orionis". Subsequent professional publications neglected to give credit to Fleming for the discovery. The first Dreyer Index Catalogue omitted Fleming's name from the list of contributors having then discovered sky objects at Harvard, attributing the entire work merely to "Pickering". However, by the time the second Dreyer Index Catalogue was published in 1908, Fleming and her female colleagues at the HCO were sufficiently well-known and received proper credit for their discoveries.

Fleming is also credited with the discovery of the first white dwarf:

In 1910, Fleming published her discovery of white dwarf stars . Her other notable publications include A Photographic Study of Variable Stars (1907), a list of 222 variable stars she had discovered; and Spectra and Photographic Magnitudes of Stars in Standard Regions (1911).

She became a US citizen in 1907.

She died of pneumonia in Boston on 21 May 1911.

Honors
 Member of the Astronomical and Astrophysical Society of America and the Astronomical Society of France
 Honorary member of the Royal Astronomical Society of London in 1906, the first American woman to be elected
 Honorary fellow in astronomy of Wellesley College

Legacy
 The Fleming lunar crater was jointly named after her and (not closely related) Alexander Fleming
 The asteroid  5747 Williamina is named after her.
The women of the Harvard Computers were famous during their lifetimes, but were largely forgotten in the following century. In 2015, Lindsay Smith Zrull, curator of Harvard's Plate Stacks collection, was working to catalog and digitize the astronomical plates for Digital Access to a Sky Century @ Harvard (DASCH)and discovered about 118 boxes, each containing 20 to 30 notebooks, from women computers and early Harvard astronomers. She realized that the 2,500+ volumes were outside the scope of her work with DASCH, but wanted to see the material preserved and made accessible. Smith Zrull reached out to librarians at the Harvard–Smithsonian Center for Astrophysics. 

In response, the Wolbach Library launched Project PHaEDRA (Preserving Harvard's Early Data and Research in Astronomy). Daina Bouquin, Wolbach's Head Librarian, explained that the objective is to enable full-text search of the research: "If you search for Williamina Fleming, you're not going to just find a mention of her in a publication where she wasn't the author of her work. You're going to find her work." 

In July 2017, the Wolbach Library at the Center for Astrophysics  Harvard & Smithsonian unveiled a display showcasing Fleming's work, including the log book containing the Horsehead Nebula discovery. The library has dozens of volumes of Fleming's work in its PHaEDRA collection.

, about 200 of over 2,500 volumes had been transcribed. The task is expected to take years to fully complete. Some of the notebooks are listed via the Smithsonian Digital Volunteers Web site, which encourages volunteers to transcribe them.

References

Further reading

External links

 Waldee, S. R.; Hazen, M. L. (November 1990). The discovery of early photographs of the Horsehead nebula. Publications of the Astronomical Society of the Pacific. 102: 1337  
 The Horsehead Nebula in the 19th Century, by Waldee (archived)
 Cannon, Annie J. (November 1911). Williamina Paton Fleming. The Astrophysical Journal. 34: 314.  
 Bibliography from the Astronomical Society of the Pacific
 Project Continua: Biography of Williamina Paton Fleming Project Continua is a web-based multimedia resource dedicated to the creation and preservation of women's intellectual history from the earliest surviving evidence into the 21st Century.
 Birth and Marriage details from ScotlandsPeople : Statutory Birth Record 282/02/0700; Statutory Marriage Record 282/03/0098

Obituaries
 

1857 births
1911 deaths
American women astronomers
American women scientists
Harvard Computers
Harvard University staff
Horsehead Nebula
Scientists from Dundee
Scottish astronomers
Scottish emigrants to the United States
Scottish women scientists